The 2018 International GT Open was the thirteenth season of the International GT Open, the grand tourer-style sports car racing founded in 2006 by the Spanish GT Sport Organización. It began on 14 April at Estoril and finished on 21 October, at Barcelona after seven double-header meetings.

Entry list

Notes

Race calendar
A seven-round provisional calendar was revealed on 30 September 2017. The schedule will feature the same seven European circuits, with the order of Le Castellet and Spa swapped.
Bold indicates overall winner.

Championship standings

Overall

References

External links
 

International GT Open
International GT Open seasons